Mucheettukalikkarante Makal (The Card Sharper's Daughter) is a novel by Vaikom Muhammad Basheer published in 1951. Written in the colloquial tongue and filled with exceptional humour, the novel remains a best seller in Malayalam literature.

Plot summary
Ottakkannan Pokker barely ekes out a living as a card sharper. His daughter Zainaba runs a small tea shop in the market place. She falls in love with Mandan Muthappa. Pokker objects this relationship because he hoped for a better son-in-law. The story develops with love between Zainaba and Mandan Muthappa and ends with how Mandan Muthappa defeated Ottakkannan Pokker in the card game.

References

Novels by Vaikom Muhammad Basheer
1951 novels
Malayalam novels
Novels set in Kerala
1951 Indian novels